Eynabad (also Romanized as ‘Eynābād; also known as Anār and Anāra) is a village in Duzaj Rural District, Kharqan District, Zarandieh County, Markazi Province, Iran. At the 2006 census, its population was 174, in 66 families.

References 

Populated places in Zarandieh County